Nepenthes 'Kalamity' is a cultivar of a complex manmade hybrid involving N. ampullaria, N. gracilis, N. khasiana, N. rafflesiana, N. ventricosa, and a plant identified as N. anamensis. It was bred by Bruce Lee Bednar and Orgel Clyde Bramblett in 1988. This cultivar name is not established as it was published without a description, violating Article 24.1 of the International Code of Nomenclature for Cultivated Plants. It first appeared in print in the March 1994 issue of the Carnivorous Plant Newsletter as "x kalamity".


See also
List of Nepenthes cultivars

Notes

a.Nepenthes anamensis is now considered a heterotypic synonym of N. smilesii, but, like other Indochinese species of the "N. thorelii aggregate", it was the subject of considerable horticultural confusion in the past.

References

External links
 Photographs of Nepenthes 'Kalamity'

Kalamity